The Bubasteum or Bubasteion was a Ptolemaic and Roman temple complex dedicated to Bastet in the cliff face of the desert boundary of Saqqara. In Arabic the place is called Abwab el-Qotat ("The Gates of the Cats").

It had a large entrance way in the south wall, a feline necropolis and settlements. In the New Kingdom, the location  was already the site of a temple of Bastet, who was honoured as the Lady of Ankhtawy.

Proper investigation of the site was begun in 1976 by  Alain-Pierre Zivie and the first excavations began in 1980. In 1986, the Mission Archéologique Française du Bubasteion (MAFB), was founded, which has overseen all investigations of the site since then.

Feline necropolis 

In the second half of the 18th Dynasty, high dignitaries created rock-cut tombs for themselves in this area, which were later reused as cat-catacombs. To date, more than a hundred cat mummies and thousands of cat bones have been found. The cat cemetery developed in the second half of the first millennium BC became as important as the cat cemetery at Bubastis. Radiographic investigations showed that the majority of cats were killed at a young age by either strangulation or by violent blows on their skulls. Several examined packets contained only a few cat bones, and others even no bones at all, but only clay and pebbles. The cats were mummified in two different manners. In the one, the legs and tail were bound and wrapped close to the body; in the other, head, body, legs and tail were separately wrapped in cloth, some with eyes and ears added. Some mummies were found in wooden or stone sarcophagi. Some were even buried with kittens, sculptures, jewellery and amulets. The mummification procedure was quite basic: the animal was simply dried out without removing the innards. The priests perhaps sold pilgrims mummies of different qualities.

In the tomb of Tutankhamun's wet-nurse Maia found on the site in 1996, a lion skeleton was excavated in 2001. The lion was considered a manifestation of the god Maahes, son of Bastet.

In 2019, five lion mummies were found at the necropolis.

Tombs 

On the south side of the Bubasteum, near the excavation headquarters of the French mission, is a Steilhang, which contains two levels of tombs. These were created by high officials in the 18th and 19th Dynasties and were plundered in the Late Period. After this they were remodelled and reused for the cat mummies from the nearby sanctuary of Bastet. Two of these tombs were discovered in the early 1980s and the rest have been uncovered more recently. The majority of the graves are carved from the rock face, but some are built of high-value Tura limestone. The decoration is very diverse, often differing significantly within individual tombs. It consists mainly of reliefs, as well as paintings which vary from good to exceptional quality. Many of the items discovered in the tombs, especially those from the tomb of Aperel, are now found in the Imhotep Museum at Saqqara.

List of the tombs in the Bubasteum 
The numbering of the tombs is that of the MAFB, in which the tombs of the upper level are numbered with a Roman numeral I and those of the lower level with a II. There is possibly a third level, buried under debris. After the roman numeral, the individual tombs are numbered from east to west with Arabic numerals

See also 

 Mervat Seif el-Din

Notes

References

Bibliography 
 Dieter Arnold: Lexikon der ägyptischen Baukunst. Albatros, Düsseldorf 2000, pp. 43–44, → Bubasteion (Saqqara).
 Alain-Pierre Zivie: The Lost Tombs of Saqqara. cara.cara edition, Toulouse 2007, .

External links 

 Project website of the Mission archéologique française du Bubasteion (French)

1976 archaeological discoveries
Egyptian temples
Buildings and structures in Giza Governorate
Saqqara
Bastet